Clarinet Summit was a project organized by producer Joachim-Ernst Berendt in 1979.

The 1979 concert was released on MPS Records as You Better Fly Away.   It features John Carter, Perry Robinson, Gianluigi Trovesi, Bernd Konrad, Theo Jörgensmann, Ernst-Ludwig Petrowsky, Didier Lockwood, Stan Tracey, Eje Thelin, Kai Kanthak, Jean-François Jenny-Clark, Günter Sommer, Aldo Romano.

Later John Carter founded a group called Clarinet Summit. A 1984 concert, released separately as Clarinet Summit and Clarinet Summit, Vol. 2 (both on India Navigation) were reissued together as In Concert at the Public Theater.   It features Carter, Alvin Batiste, David Murray, Jimmy Hamilton

In 1987, Southern Bells was released on Black Saint, featuring the same quartet.

Since 2015, some former members of the “Clarinet Summit 1979” work together again as Clarinet Summit. The members of the group are Perry Robinson, Theo Jörgensmann,  Gianluigi Trovesi, Bernd Konrad, Albrecht Maurer, Sebastian Gramss and Günter Sommer.

In 2017, this formation released a live CD titled Clarinet Summit.

References

American jazz ensembles
Black Saint/Soul Note artists
India Navigation artists
MPS Records artists